Alte Elbe (lit. Old Elbe) is the German name for oxbows of the Elbe, i.e. cut-off meanders. With about  the largest one of these is the Dornburger Alte Elbe, a river of Saxony-Anhalt, Germany.

It branches of the Elbe near , a district of Gommern.
It flows into the Elbe at Magdeburg.

See also
List of rivers of Saxony-Anhalt

References

Rivers of Saxony-Anhalt
0AlteElbe
Rivers of Germany